Ammyy (sometimes called AMMYY) was a company which created the remote desktop software called Ammyy Admin. It was often used by scammers who cold-call homes to try to gain access to their computer.

Since 2011 the company has issued warnings about these scammers who abuse their software against its intended purposes.

See also
Event Viewer
Technical support scam

References

Remote desktop